Richard Benjamin Haymes (September 13, 1918 – March 28, 1980) was an Argentinian singer, songwriter and actor. He was one of the most popular male vocalists of the 1940s and early 1950s. He was the older brother of Bob Haymes, an actor, television host, and songwriter.

Background 
Haymes was born in Buenos Aires, Argentina in 1918. His mother, who survived her elder son, was Marguerite Haymes (1894–1987), a well-known Irish-born vocal coach and instructor of English descent. His father, also of English descent, worked as a rancher. The Haymes family traveled extensively before settling in the United States when Haymes was an infant.

Career 
At the age of 17, Haymes moved to Los Angeles where he initially worked as a stunt man and film double. At the age of 19, he moved to New York City where he worked as a vocalist in a number of big bands.  On September 3, 1942, Frank Sinatra introduced Haymes on radio as Sinatra's replacement in the Tommy Dorsey band. Prior to joining Dorsey's group, Haymes sang with the Harry James orchestra.

In 1945, Haymes co-starred with Jeanne Crain, Dana Andrews and Vivian Blaine in the musical State Fair. He teamed with female vocalist Helen Forrest for many hit duets during World War II, including "Together," "I'll Buy That Dream," and "Long Ago and Far Away"; he sang with Judy Garland on two Decca recordings of songs from the film The Shocking Miss Pilgrim, in which he appeared with Betty Grable. From 1944 to 1948, he had his own radio program, The Dick Haymes Show, first on NBC and later on CBS.

He paired repeatedly with the Andrews Sisters  on a dozen or so Decca collaborations, including the Billboard hit "Teresa," "Great Day," "My Sin," and a 1952 rendering of the dramatic ballad "Here in My Heart," backed by the sisters and Nelson Riddle's lush strings. His duets with Patty Andrews were also well received, both on Decca vinyl and on radio's Club Fifteen with the sisters, which he hosted in 1949 and 1950. He also joined Bing Crosby and The Andrews Sisters for 1947 session that produced the Billboard hit "There's No Business Like Show Business," as well as "Anything You Can Do (I Can Do Better)". His popular renditions of tender ballads such as "Little White Lies" and "Maybe It's Because" were recorded with celebrated arranger Gordon Jenkins and his orchestra and chorus.

World War II 
Haymes's birth in Argentina to non-U.S. citizens meant he was not an American citizen. In order to avoid military service during World War II, Haymes asserted his nonbelligerent status as a citizen of Argentina, which remained neutral until almost the end of the war. Hollywood-based columnists Louella Parsons and Hedda Hopper questioned Haymes' patriotism, but the story had surprisingly little effect on his career. About that time, he was classified 4-F by the draft board because of hypertension. As part of his draft examination, he was confined for a short period to a hospital on Ellis Island, which confirmed his diagnosis of hypertension.

In 1953, Haymes went to Hawaii (then a territory and, technically, not part of the United States) without first notifying immigration authorities. On returning to the mainland United States, he was nearly deported to Argentina, but won his battle to remain in the United States.

Later years 

Haymes experienced serious financial problems later in life, by the early 1960s declaring bankruptcy with $500,000 in debts.

He appeared as unscrupulous doctor Elroy Gantman in a 1974 episode of the TV show Adam-12.

Through his mother's nationality, Haymes spent his last years as an Irish citizen.

Marriages 
Haymes was married six times, including to film actresses Joanne Dru (1941–1949), Rita Hayworth (1953–1955), and Fran Jeffries (1958–1964). He was also married to Nora Eddington (1949–1953), a former wife of Errol Flynn. Haymes had a total of six children—three with Joanne Dru, one with Fran Jeffries, and two with his sixth and final wife, British model Wendy Smith.

Death 
Haymes died from lung cancer on March 28, 1980, at Cedars-Sinai Medical Center in Los Angeles. He was 61 years old.

Discography

78rpm albums 
Dick Haymes Sings – Carmen Cavallaro at the Piano – Irving Berlin Songs (1948 Decca Record)

Original LPs 
 Rain or Shine (1955)
 Moondreams (1957)
 Look at Me Now! (1957)
 Richard the Lion-Hearted – Dick Haymes that is! (1960)

LP compilations 
 Dick Haymes (1950s)
 Little White Lies (1958)
 Dick Haymes – Maury Laws Orchestra / Featuring Cy Coleman (1960s)
 Love Letters (1960s)
 Spotlight On – Dick Haymes Sings Romantic Ballads – Featuring Johnny Kay (1960s)
 Easy (1973)
 Imagination (1982) (also available  on CD)

Live LP albums 
 Dick Haymes Comes Home! (1973)

Selected CD compilations 
 (2016) Dick Haymes You'll Never Know His 53 Finest 2 CDset (Retrospective)
 (1990) Richard the Lion-Hearted – Dick Haymes that is! (1990) re-issue of the vinyl album
 Imagination (1992)
 The Very Best of Dick Haymes, Vol. 1 (1997)
 The Very Best of Dick Haymes, Vol. 2 (1997)
 The Complete Columbia Recordings – with Harry James and Benny Goodman (1998)
 Little White Lies: 25 Original Mono Recordings 1942-1050. Living Era. ASV Mono.  CD AJA 5387 (2001)
 Christmas Wishes (2002, radio transcriptions)
 Golden Years of Dick Haymes (2003)
 The Complete Capitol Collection (2006)

Filmography 
 Mutiny on the Bounty (1935) – Able-Bodied Seaman (uncredited)
 Dramatic School (1938) – Student (uncredited)
 Du Barry Was a Lady (1943) – Singer (uncredited)
 Girl Crazy (1943) – Member, The Pied Pipers (uncredited)
 Four Jills in a Jeep (1944) – Lt. Dick Ryan
 Irish Eyes Are Smiling (1944) – Ernest R. Ball
 I Am an American (1944) – Himself (uncredited)
 Diamond Horseshoe (1945) – Joe Davis Jr.
 State Fair (1945) – Wayne Frake
 Fallen Angel (1945) – Himself – JukeBox Vocalist (voice, uncredited)
 Do You Love Me (1946) – Jimmy Hale
 The Shocking Miss Pilgrim (1947) – John Pritchard
 Carnival in Costa Rica (1947) – Jeff Stephens
 Up in Central Park (1948) – John Matthews
 One Touch of Venus (1948) – Joe Grant
 Words and Music (1948) – Himself
 St. Benny the Dip (1951) – Benny
 Hollywood Fun Festival (1952) – Master of Ceremonies
 All Ashore (1953) – Joe Carter
 Let's Do It Again (1953) – Singer – 'I Could Never Love Anyone But You' (voice, uncredited)
 Cruisin' Down the River (1953) – Beauregard Clemment / Beau Clemment III
 Adam-12 (1974) (TV) – Dr. Elroy Gantman
 Hec Ramsey – S2E04 – Scar Tissue (1974) (TV) ~ Hamilton Hobbs
 Betrayal (1974) (TV) – Harold Porter
 Won Ton Ton, the Dog Who Saved Hollywood (1976) – James Crawford
 The Eddie Capra Mysteries (1978) (TV – episode "Murder on the Flip Side") – Jason Lamb

Hit records

Musical theatre 
 Miss Liberty (1951, Dallas Theatre)
The Big Broadcast of 1944, - A Lee Gruber, Shelly Gross off Broadway production, fall of 1979 – Devon, PA, Detroit, MI, and Westbury, NY

Radio appearances

See also 

 Al Lerner (composer)

References

Further reading

External links 

 
 
 [ Dick Haymes] at Allmusic
 Homepage of: 'The Dick Haymes Society'
 Haymes' entry at Solid! – The encyclopedia of big band, lounge, classic jazz and space-age sounds
 Dick Haymes: Hollywood's Balladeer Supreme article by Laura Wagner at Classic Images – Films of the Golden Age (online magazine)
 Dick Haymes recordings at the Discography of American Historical Recordings.

1918 births
1980 deaths
20th-century Argentine male actors
20th-century Argentine male singers
Apex Records artists
Argentine emigrants to the United States
Argentine male film actors
Argentine people of English descent
Argentine people of Irish descent
Argentine male radio actors
Argentine male stage actors
Argentine male television actors
Capitol Records artists
Deaths from lung cancer in California
Decca Records artists
Jubilee Records artists
Male actors from Buenos Aires
Singers from Buenos Aires
Traditional pop music singers